Zaire Bartley (born 5 March 1998) is a Jamaican footballer who plays as a midfielder for New Amsterdam FC in the National Independent Soccer Association.

Career

Club 
Bartley made his debut with United Soccer League side New York Red Bulls II on 13 July 2017, as a 79th-minute substitute in a 2-0 loss to Harrisburg City Islanders.

Following stints at New York Cosmos B and MFK Vyškov in the Czech Republic, Bartley signed with USL League One side Forward Madison FC ahead of their inaugural season. He made his league debut for the club on April 6, 2019, coming on as a 71st minute substitute for Jiro Toyama in a 1-0 away defeat to Chattanooga Red Wolves SC.

International 

Bartley featured for the Jamaica U17 national team in 2015.

Personal
Bartley was born in New York City, but both his parents are from Jamaica and lived on the island for three years.

References

External links
 
 
 jamaicafootballfederation.com

Living people
1998 births
Jamaican footballers
Jamaican expatriate footballers
Jamaican expatriate sportspeople in the United States
Expatriate soccer players in the United States
Association football midfielders
New York Red Bulls II players
Forward Madison FC players
New Amsterdam FC players
USL Championship players
USL League One players
National Independent Soccer Association players
Soccer players from New York (state)